Christmas Star or Christmas star may refer to:
 Star of Bethlehem, said to have revealed the birth of Jesus and showed the wise men the way to Bethlehem 
 Froebel star, a Christmas decoration made from paper
 Moravian star, a Christmas decoration
 Poinsettia, a plant species of the diverse spurge family
 A star-shaped tree-topper
 "Christmas Star", a song in the 1992 film Home Alone 2: Lost in New York
 A Christmas Star, a 2015 British Christmas film
 The 2020 great conjunction between Jupiter and Saturn, widely referred to as the "Christmas Star" in the media.